Fagus mexicana, the Mexican beech or haya, is a species of beech endemic to northeastern and central Mexico, where it occurs from Nuevo León, Tamaulipas south to Hidalgo, Veracruz and Puebla. It is restricted to Tropical montane cloud forests in the Sierra Madre Oriental.

It is closely related to the American beech Fagus grandifolia and is usually treated as Fagus grandifolia subsp. mexicana (Martínez) E.Murray.

Description
Fagus mexicana is a deciduous tree, reaching heights of 25–40 m tall and up to 1 m trunk diameter. The leaves are alternate and simple, with a slightly toothed margin, usually smaller than those of American beech, 5–8 cm long and 3–5 cm broad. The buds are long and slender, 15–25 mm long and 2–3 mm thick.

The flowers are small catkins which appear shortly after the leaves in spring. The seeds are small triangular nuts 15–20 mm long and 7–10 mm wide at the base; there are two nuts in each cupule, maturing in the autumn 6–7 months after pollination.

References

mexicana
Endemic flora of Mexico
Flora of Central Mexico
Flora of Northeastern Mexico
Trees of Hidalgo (state)
Trees of Puebla
Trees of Tamaulipas
Flora of the Sierra Madre Oriental
Plants described in 1939